The North Division One (currently known as the 'Mowi North Division 1' for sponsorship reasons) is the third tier of the Shinty league system. League champions are awarded the MacGillivary Cup and play-off against the South Division One champions for promotion to the National Division.

Current Teams 
The 201 Mowi North Division 1 will consist of the following teams:

*Denotes Reserve team

Aberdeen University Shinty Club
Caberfeidh Camanachd Club 2nd*
Fort William Shinty Club 2nd*
Glenurquhart Shinty Club 2nd*
Glengarry Shinty Club
Inverness Shinty Club
Kingussie Camanachd 2nd*
Kinlochshiel Shinty Club 2nd*
Lovat Shinty Club 2nd*
Newtonmore Camanachd Club 2nd*
Skye Camanachd 2nd*

History

1980's: North Division One the top tier of Shinty. National final between winner of North Division One and South Division One.

1996: Premier Division founded making North Division One the second tier of Shinty.

1996 to 1999: Winners of North Division One and South Division One playing in National final with eventual winner gaining promotion to Premier Division.

1999 to 2006: National Division One becomes third tier of shinty with advent of National Division One. Winners of North Division One and South Division One playing in National final with eventual winner gaining promotion to National Division One (2nd tier).

2007: North Division One once again becomes the second tier of Shinty with the folding of National Division One. Champions guaranteed promotion to the Premier Division.

2009: Ban on reserve teams being promoted abolished. Glenurquhart Reserves refuse promotion saving Lochcarron from relegation.

2010 and 2011: Winners of North Division Two refuse promotion preventing any relegations.

2013: Lochcarron take voluntary relegation leaving only six teams.

2014: North Division One once again becomes the third tier of Shinty with the reinstatement of National Division One with North Division One champions being promoted through a play-off win.

List of winners (since 2014)
2014 - Skye Camanachd 2nd 
2015 - Fort William 2nd
2016 - Newtonmore Camanachd Club 2nd
2017 - Newtonmore Camanachd Club 2nd
2018 - Newtonmore Camanachd Club 2nd

References

External links
Marine Harvest North Division One

Shinty competitions